Jiehkkevárri (alternative spellings: Jiekkevarri, Jiekkevarre, or Jæggevarre) is a mountain on the border of the municipalities of Lyngen and Tromsø in Troms og Finnmark county, Norway. It is the highest mountain in Troms og Finnmark and has the second highest prominence (primary factor) among Norwegian mountains.

The first people known to have climbed it were Geoffrey Hastings (British) and Elias Hogrenning (Norwegian) in 1899. Its summit is ice-capped and any ascent involves a crossing of crevassed glaciers. Therefore, climbing it needs guiding by experienced mountaineers.

In winter, an experienced ski-mountaineer can traverse Jiehkkevárri in one long day, descending almost from the top via the steep, northeast facing couloir, described by the late Andreas Fransson as "a future classic for the new generation of mountain skiers". The descent route is exposed to serac fall from above, and is generally not recommended for ascending.

Name
The name is a compound of the Sami language words jiehkki which means "glacier" and várri which means "mountain".

See also
 List of highest points of Norwegian counties
 List of European ultra prominent peaks

References

External links
 "Jiehkkesvárri, Norway" on Peakbagger

Mountains of Troms og Finnmark
Tromsø
Lyngen
Highest points of Norwegian counties